Ricardo Duchesne is a Puerto Rican-born Canadian historical sociologist and former professor at the University of New Brunswick. His main research interests are Western civilization, the rise of the West, and multiculturalism. Duchesne's views on immigration and multiculturalism have been described as racist and white nationalist. He has denied being a racist to the mainstream press, but has described himself as being "the only academic in Canada, and possibly the Western world, who questions the ideology of diversity while advocating white identity politics."

Biographical Information and Career Overview 
Duchesne was born in Puerto Rico; his mother Coralie Tattersall Duchesne was a British citizen born in Calcutta, his father Juan Duchesne Landrón a medical doctor of Afro-Puerto Rican and French heritage. His parents met when his mother was studying at the Sorbonne; they were wed in Tangier, had three children while living in Madrid, and three more, including Ricardo, after they moved to Puerto Rico in 1956. His parents divorced in 1970 and Ricardo Duchesne's mother moved to Montreal, where she became active in the local cultural scene as an actress and playwright; he joined her there in the mid-1970s when he was 15 years old. In Montreal he studied History at McGill University, and later at Concordia University under the supervision of George Rudé. In 1996, he received a doctorate in Social & Political Thought at York University for his 1994 Dissertation, "All Contraries Confounded: Historical Materialism and the Transition-to-Capitalism Debate".  In 1995, Duchesne was appointed assistant professor in the department of social science at the University of New Brunswick. He took an early retirement from his position in 2019, following complaints of racism and hate speech.

Of his siblings, his older brother, Juan Ramón Duchesne Winter, has become a professor of Latin American Literature at the University of Pittsburgh with a special interest in indigenous cultures. Their sister Giselle Duchesne is a Spanish-language poet. Another sister, Rossana Duchesne, has helped document the history of Duchesne family members who were notable jazz musicians, including Puerto Rican relatives who played in New York during the Harlem Renaissance. Their grandfather Rafael Duchesne Mondriguez was a significant jazz clarinetist and composer who played as a soloist with the Harlem Hellfighters, the American regimental band that introduced jazz music to Europe, as part of his military service during the First World War.  After the war he returned to live in Puerto Rico where he taught music and continued to perform and compose. Ricardo Duchesne's uncle, José "Keko" Luis Duchesne Landrón, was a saxophonist and a member of El Gran Combo de Puerto Rico from 1969 to 1980.

Ricardo Duchesne is married to the dance choreographer Georgia Rondos. They have two children.

Ideas

The Uniqueness of Western Civilization

Themes 
Duchesne's first book, The Uniqueness of Western Civilization, published in 2011, criticizes the work of world historians, such as Immanuel Wallerstein and Andre Gunder Frank, who he argues portray history in terms that support the egalitarian idea that all cultures are equally significant, devaluing Western civilization and its contributions in the process. Duchesne challenges historians, such as Kenneth Pomeranz and Roy Bin Wong, whose work posits Chinese economic and intellectual pre-eminence prior to 1800, and maintains that the culture of the West has always been "in a state of variance from the world" at least since classical antiquity, characterized by multiple divergences, successive revolutions, and continuous creativity in all fields of human endeavor. He traces the West's restlessness and creative spirit to what he characterizes as the unique aristocratic culture of Indo-Europeans, with its ethos of heroic individualism, weaker kinship ties, war bands bound together by voluntary oaths of loyalty and fraternity, and its original pastoral package of wheeled vehicles, horse-riding, and chariots.

Reception 
A number of academics and historians praised Duchesne's writing in The Uniqueness of Western Civilization, noting in particular the breadth of scholarship demonstrated throughout the book. Martin Hewson, politics and international studies professor at the University of Regina, points to Duchesne's The Uniqueness of Western Civilization as the leading book in what he describes as a trend toward "post-multicultural history". Hewson states that "The main achievement of post-multicultural world history is to have established that there were numerous critical non-economic divergences between Europe and other regions. The West was both peculiar and inventive across many domains." David Northrup noted that "although The Uniqueness of Western Civilization may well upset or infuriate world historians, they have much to gain from reading it, since it presents summaries and critiques of a great many works in comparative world, European, and Asian history." However, he found the book "deliberately and openly tendentious" and, assessing how the various elements of the argument presented in the book fit together, concluded that the book's effort at “[s]tringing all of these pieces together coherently is more imaginative than persuasive". Steve Balch, Director of The Institute for the Study of Western Civilization at Texas Tech University, said "The Uniqueness of Western Civilization is old-school scholarship at its best: consequential, closely reasoned, richly evidenced, and professionally courteous." Thomas D. Hall, although critical of the book in many respects and finding that it "gives a sense of pontificating from on high", concludes that The Uniqueness of Western Civilization "despite my stylistic critiques shows a very wide range of scholarship and many deft syntheses. It is an impressive book." Eric Jones wrote that The Uniqueness of Western Civilization was a "staggeringly well-informed work...displaying prodigious learning in historical anthropology... an indispensable reference on the great passages of history." Jones's review considered the book to excel in its analysis and critique of other scholars, while also pointing out that Duchesne's "method, like that of the revisionists [whom Duchesne criticizes], owes too much to Marxist-style rhetoric".  However, he expressed doubt concerning Duchesne’s thesis attributing the progress of the West to aristocratic competitiveness inherited from “invading, prestige-hungry Indo-European steppe nomads”, saying that “these hoary, contentious themes are really several orders of magnitude more speculative than the tracts of early modern history where Duchesne fences with the most fashionable of the revisionists." Similalrly, Peter Turchin, while considering the book "interesting and thought-provoking", criticised it for "allowing ideology to drive the agenda" and also noting serious methodological issues that he claimed the book shared with other scholarly work in the field.

Scholars of Asian history had particular concerns about the work. Mark Elvin, a professor of Chinese history, describes Uniqueness in the Canadian Journal of Sociology as an "alpha-delta book - with some very good and some unnervingly bad components." He expresses doubt about Duchesne's theses and notes that Duchesne lacks the familiarity with non-Western history and cultures that would be needed to do the kind of comparative work that the book professes to contain.  A review by Geetanjali Srikantan, a historian of India, is more critical than Elvin's, mentioning that "non-Western theorists" are not analyzed in the text, and observes that the book contains "discrepancies that one does not expect in an academic text". He criticises Duchesne for failing to provide “a coherent description of Western culture”, maintaining that the connection Duchesne draws between Western predominance and the ancient “‘aristrocratic warlike culture’ of the Indo-Europeans” rests on shaky ground because the definition of Western culture offered by Duchesne is so vague. He concludes that "It is clearly alarming that such scholarship has had positive reviews."

Kevin McDonald, an evolutionary psychiatrist and white supremacist known for his antisemitic conspiracy theories, wrote a 22 page review in which he praised the book as "a brilliant work written by an exceptionally wide-ranging scholar and thinker." McDonald would go on to publish much of Duchesne's subsequent work in The Occidental Quarterly, which McDonald edits. Gerald Russello, writing in The Dorchester Review, praised "Duchesne's marshalling of enormous amounts of data and his obviously wide reading...", saying that "His thesis about the Indo-Europeans and the differences he perceives between the West and other cultures is based on solid historical and archeological research".

In a review in the journal The European Legacy, right-wing academic Grant Havers wrote that Duchesne "brings to his study an erudition that is matched only by Marx, Spengler, and Voegelin. Ricardo Duchesne demonstrates his mastery of anthropology, philosophy, religion, economics, and especially world history". Havers also criticised Duchesne's work for attributing the prominence of the West to an aristocratic "Nietzschian ideal of pagan greatness", and for de-emphasising the importance of Christianity, which Havers sees as the "founding faith" of the West, "whose egalitarianism in undermining aristocratic pride made the modern democratic West possible".

Subsequent work

Duchesne has voiced vehement criticisms of political correctness, multiculturalism, and immigration. He has bemoaned what he describes as a "relentless occupation of the West by hordes of Muslims and Africans", and states that "only out of the coming chaos and violence will strong White men rise to resurrect the West." Duchesne also criticizes some conservatives for advancing the idea that Western political identity is based only on universal liberal democratic values that are true for all human beings. He argues that liberalism is uniquely Western and that Western identity is also deeply connected to the ethnic character of Europeans. More recently, Duchesne has argued that civic nationalism is consistent with a strong collective sense of ethnic national identity.

In mid-2014, he created the blog "Council of European Canadians" with the stated purpose that "Canada should remain majority, not exclusively, European in its ethnic composition and cultural character [because] Canada is a nation created by individuals with an Anglo/French-European heritage, not by individuals from diverse races and cultures." He has denied being a racist to the mainstream press, but has nonetheless become more comfortable with white identity politics in the articles he writes for his blog.

Duchesne claims in his book, Canada in Decay: Mass Immigration, Diversity, and the Ethnocide of Euro-Canadians (2017), to support identity politics for whites, within the constitutional framework of Canadian multiculturalism. A critic of the overall philosophy of multiculturalism and of immigration to Canada, Duchesne shares with white nationalism the belief that "Euro-Canadians" should maintain both a demographic majority and dominance of Canada’s culture and public life.  He has shown support for white nationalism, including by providing a positive endorsement and cover blurb for a book entitled The White Nationalist Manifesto. He has appeared as a featured guest on various white supremacist media outlets and he spoke at a forum of the  National Citizens Alliance, a fringe political party known for its advocacy of white nationalism and far-right conspiracy theories.

Duchesne’s 2017 book, Faustian Man In A Multi-Cultural Age (portions of which had been first published in the white nationalist magazine The Occidental Quarterly), further advanced the presence of white nationalism in Duchesne’s writing, connecting his assertions about the uniqueness of the Western spirit to theories about the genetic characteristics of European man. Whereas his first book had been published by an academic press, this one was published by Arktos Media, a frequent distributor of far-right extremist writing. In the preface and first chapters of the book Duchesne describes himself as following an intellectual journey from liberal preconceptions of racial equality to explicit avowal of Western race-based identity. The first chapter credits this transformation in part to “visiting… forbidden places”, listing the names of a series of journals and websites associated with white nationalism, neo-nazism and the alt-right.

In his other 2017 book, Canada in Decay: Mass Immigration, Diversity, and the Ethnocide of Euro-Canadians, he argues that Canada is not a "nation of immigrants" but a nation created by Anglo and French pioneers and settlers. The book questions what Duchesne argues are double standards of multiculturalism in granting both collective ethnic rights and individual rights to minorities and immigrant groups while, in his view, suppressing the ethno-cultural rights of Canadians of European descent.

Public Activities, Controversy and Retirement

Vancouver controversy 
In a May 26, 2014 blogpost, Duchesne criticized a motion of the Vancouver council to investigate discriminatory policies imposed on Chinese immigrants in the city before 1947 as an exercise in manipulating "white guilt", claiming they have "the goal of taking Canada away from the Europeans and transforming the nation into a multicultural and multiracial society." He attacked one city councillor, Kerry Jang, personally, saying that Jang "is exploiting White ideas to advance the ethnic interests of the Chinese, utilizing the same white guilt our educational institutions inflict on White children.” Duchesne sent an email to Jang and other Vancouver City councilors of Asian descent containing a link to the blogpost; he has acknowledged that he did so in order to provoke them, saying he “wanted a debate”. The comments in the blogpost then sparked controversy with Jang saying he was shocked that the city council’s move would be taken this way, that he considered Duchesne's comments to be hate speech, and that "I don't think he should be teaching." In a follow-up post, Duchesne responded by saying about Chinese Canadians: “We are thus talking about a very powerful demographic group that also happens to be very wealthy with deep ingrained connections to Communist China. This group has been allowed to alter radically the formerly elegant, serene, community-oriented, British city of Vancouver, turning it into a loud, congested Asian city (still attractive only because of the architectural and institutional legacy of past white generations).” His remarks prompted an op-ed piece in The Globe and Mail which stated that Professor Duchesne "glorifies scholarship and writing that fuels xenophobia and provides fodder for white supremacy. Mr. Duchesne is a unicultural ideologue... [whose] rants are an apostasy to sociological thinking."

At the time, the University of New Brunswick publicly defended Duchesne's right to express his views on the grounds of academic freedom, but the University also prohibited Duchesne from using the University's name or his university affiliation when expressing his political opinions on his blog or in emails. The University advised Jang, the city councillor whom Duchesne had attacked, that Duchesne would not be allowed to use his university affiliation to encourage people to read his posts about race matters and that the university would look at Duchesne’s courses to ensure that he presented a balanced and scholarly perspective. Duchesne had been reprimanded by the University in response to at least one complaint made to them regarding posts on the Council of European Canadians blog.

Public lectures and criticism 
In September 2015, a group of ten University of New Brunswick professors penned an open letter to the Toronto Star newspaper criticizing Duchesne for claiming that immigration undermines the European character of Western civilization. The letter described Duchesne's views as "devoid of academic merit".

In June 2017, Duchesne was the guest of honor at a private speaking event held by a Montreal alt-right group, according to people who were at or organized the meeting. The group was the Montreal Daily Stormer Book Club, started by neo-Nazi Gabriel Sohier Chaput as part of his efforts to organize a network of white supremacists. In response to later inquiries from journalists, Duchesne has acknowledged speaking at an event in Montreal at that time, but denied that the group which invited him identified as "alt-right" and stated that he would never speak at a meeting organized by the neo-Nazi website the Daily Stormer.

In the Spring of 2018, Duchesne was invited to lecture at the University of Waterloo together with Faith Goldy, a journalist associated with the alt-right and ideas of white supremacy. The invitation to them came from a student group co-founded by Lindsay Shepherd. Goldy's participation in the event drew strong protest and it was cancelled after Waterloo police advised the university that ever-increasing security costs for the event would reach $28,500.00.

The event was scheduled at the end of an academic year in which far-right speakers and groups had been challenging the limits of free speech on college campuses in the United States by scheduling provocative and highly-publicised speeches and events, compelling colleges and universities to spend millions of dollars in security fees alone. Shannon Dea, who was Vice-President of the Faculty Association of the University of Waterloo at the time, expressed concern that the Duchesne/Goldy event was one of a series of "repeated efforts by fringe groups to lay traps for universities by organizing on-campus events featuring speakers calculated to provoke a response," through which the organizers benefit from the prestige of the university if it is held but can claim they are victimized by excessive "political correctness" if it is not. The Faculty Association chose not to object to the holding of the event, responding instead by using it as an occasion to fundraise for university groups devoted to Indigenous, racialized, and international students.

Duchesne stirred further controversy by appearing as a guest on Faith Goldy's podcast.

Upon the invitation of UBC Students For Academic Freedom, Ricardo Duchesne gave a lecture at the University of British Columbia in the Fall of 2018, introduced by Lindsay Shepherd, entitled "Critical Reflections on Canadian Multiculturalism", in which he asserted the right of "Euro-Canadians" to "white identity politics" within the framework of Canada's official multiculturalism. While visiting Vancouver to present the lecture, Duchesne courted controversy and publicity, walking around the university campus together with a camerawoman and challenging random passers-by to debate him on immigration, gay rights and the merits of a white ethnostate.

In May 2019, Ricardo Duchesne was indirectly linked to an attempt that had been made to embarrass the People’s Party of Canada, a fringe right wing Canadian political party. Fake emails containing explicitly racist content were sent out, in the names of two senior party executives, to a former party member who had quit in protest against what he had considered to be the party’s racist turn, apparently with the intention that the recipient would then publicize the disturbing messages. Some of the suspect content of the emails was plagiarized from posts made by Ricardo Duchesne on his Council of European Canadians website and falsely attributed to the two executive officers. The webpage by Duchesne from which the content was copied has since been deleted from the Council of European Canadians blog.

On October 9, 2019, Ricardo Duchesne and Mark Hecht spoke at the UBC-Vancouver campus at an event hosted by the UBC Students for Freedom of Expression. The event, titled "Academic Freedom to Discuss the Impact of Immigrant Diversity", was met by dozens of protesters claiming that the university should not give a platform to "far right" hate speech.

Investigation and retirement 
In May 2019, The University of New Brunswick announced that it would review further complaints related to Duchesne's public comments and views on race after it was reported that he had written blog posts alleging that immigration was part of a conspiracy to advance white genocide. A group of over 100 of Duchesne's colleagues at the University of New Brunswick signed an open letter of complaint stating that Duchesne’s blog posts, and even at times his classroom teachings, had no merit, and qualified as hate speech that should not be protected by university policies of academic freedom. The Canadian Historical Association also wrote a letter denouncing Duchesne's work in similar terms. In response, Duchesne stated that the signatories did not have "any scholarly background" in immigration or multiculturalism, and  that the charge of racism "has been overused beyond reason...and is used against anyone who questions this diversity." His response was disputed, as at least two of the signatories did specialize in aspects of multiculturalism and immigration to Canada. Mark Mercer, president of the Society for Academic Freedom and Scholarship questioned the school's decision to review Duchesne, and argued that Duchesne's work should be protected in the name of academic freedom.

The following month, on June 4, 2019, the University announced that Duchesne was taking early retirement. The terms of his settlement with them prohibit him from speaking publicly about the circumstances leading to his retirement.

Duchesne had stopped publishing in mainstream academic journals even before his retirement. Since then, he has continued his research and writing as an independent scholar, publishing articles on his Council of Euro-Canadians blog and in Kevin McDonald's white nationalist journal, The Occidental Quarterly. More recently, he published an extended review of Joseph Henrich's The WEIRDest People, in Mankind Quarterly, a peer-reviewed journal that has been described as a "cornerstone of the scientific racism establishment", a "white supremacist journal", and "a pseudo-scholarly outlet for promoting racial inequality". He has also published in The Postil Magazine.

Bibliography 
 
 
 
 "Defending the Rise of Western Culture Against its Multicultural Critics," The European Legacy: Toward New Paradigms  (2005) 10#5, pp. 455–484.  online

References

Further reading 
 Groves, J. Randall (2012). "Rationalization, Dialectic and the West: An Appraisal of Ricardo Duchesne's Uniqueness of Western Civilization". In: The Coming Clash of Civilization: China versus the West? Proceedings of the 42nd Conference of the International Society for the Comparative Study of Civilizations. (Washington, D.C.): 165-177.

External links 
 Personal website
 The Council of Euro-Canadians — Duchesne's political blog
 Research Gate—Duchesne's research profile

Canadian sociologists
Concordia University alumni
Living people
McGill University alumni
Academic staff of the University of New Brunswick
York University alumni
Year of birth missing (living people)
Critics of multiculturalism
Far-right politics in Canada